George Patrick Monaghan (June 10, 1901 – September 6, 1986) was an American lawyer, fire commissioner and police commissioner.

Biography
He was an assistant district attorney in Manhattan. Among the cases in which he appeared for the prosecution was the trial of John M. Dunn for the murder of Andy Hintz. He was  appointed the 16th Fire Commissioner of the City of New York by Mayor Vincent Richard Impellitteri on December 6, 1950 and served in that position until July 18, 1951 when he resigned to accept an appointment as New York City Police Commissioner to replace Thomas Francis Murphy. In 1953 he was appointed sole Harness-Racing Commissioner when Governor Dewey  abolished the earlier three-man Harness-Racing Commission.

References

Commissioners of the New York City Fire Department
New York City Police Commissioners
New York (state) lawyers
1901 births
1986 deaths
20th-century American lawyers